Laura Marcela Cosme Rodríguez (born 5 March 1992) is a Colombian footballer who plays as a forward for the Colombia women's national football team. She was part of the team at the 2015 FIFA Women's World Cup. On club level she plays for CD Palmiranas in Colombia.

References

1992 births
Living people
Women's association football forwards
Colombian women's footballers
Place of birth missing (living people)
Colombia women's international footballers
2015 FIFA Women's World Cup players
21st-century Colombian women